Priddy Nine Barrows Cemetery  and Ashen Hill Barrow Cemetery are a collection of round barrows, dating from the Bronze Age, near Priddy in the English county of Somerset. They are designated as ancient monuments.

The barrows sit on crests of land at either end of a field in an area of the Mendip Hills with several Neolithic remains. They are assumed to be related to the Priddy Circles which lie  to the north. Ashen Hill  consists of six bowl barrows and two bell barrows aligned east to west while Priddy Nine Barrows divided into one group of seven round barrows and another pair slightly separated from the others.

Excavations in 1815 uncovered cremation burials and grave goods. A geophysical magnetometry survey suggested that there may have been three further barrows.

Location

Between the barrows and Stock Hill is the Priddy Mineries, a nature reserve of the Somerset Wildlife Trust, which is itself a part of the Priddy Pools Site of Special Scientific Interest (SSSI) which was worked for lead for many centuries.

Description

Ashen Hill

Ashen Hill Barrow Cemetery is the most northerly of the sites and consists of six bowl barrows and two bell barrows aligned east to west, although :Lewes suggests that three may be bell barrows. Each is surrounded by a ditch which has become infilled over time. To the north and east of the barrows are further signs of excavations but these were related to lead extraction.

Priddy Nine Barrows

The southern area consists of the Priddy Nine Barrows which is divided into one group of seven round barrows and another pair. The group of seven are in a line on the crest of North Hill. Each is surrounded by a shallow ditch which has become partly infilled. The tops of some of the barrows have indentations which are believed to have been caused by early 19th century excavations.

They have been known as Priddy Nine Barrows since 1296.

Excavations and investigations

In 1815 John Skinner carried out a partial excavation and identified cremation burials in an oval cyst which was covered by a flat stone just below where ground level would have been in the Bronze Age. He also uncovered bronze daggers and spear head, decorative amber beads, a bronze ring and a small incense cup.

At least one of the Ashen Hill Barrows was excavated by a team led by Herbert E. Balch in 1894.

They were scheduled as ancient monuments in 1933, possibly to stop excavation by the University of Bristol Spelæological Society and local schools.

A geophysical magnetometry survey investigated the area between the existing seven and the outliers which make up Priddy Nine Barrows suggesting that there may have been three further barrows, however the work was inconclusive. The result suggested a ring ditch and some other disturbances by any further barrows could have been disturbed by lead mining.

References

Buildings and structures in Mendip District
Mendip Hills
History of Somerset
Neolithic settlements
Scheduled monuments in Mendip District
Archaeological sites in Somerset
Articles containing video clips
Bronze Age sites in Somerset